Slovakia competed at the 2002 Winter Olympics in Salt Lake City, United States.

Alpine skiing

Men

Men's combined

Women

Biathlon

Men

Women

Women's 4 × 7.5 km relay

 1 A penalty loop of 150 metres had to be skied per missed target. 
 2 Starting delay based on 10 km sprint results. 
 3 One minute added per missed target. 
 4 Starting delay based on 7.5 km sprint results.

Bobsleigh

Men

Cross-country skiing

Men
Pursuit

 1 Starting delay based on 10 km C. results. 
 C = Classical style, F = Freestyle

Women
Pursuit

 2 Starting delay based on 5 km C. results. 
 C = Classical style, F = Freestyle

Figure skating

Women

Pairs

Ice hockey

Men's tournament

Preliminary round - group A
Top team (shaded) advanced to the first round.

Consolation round
13th place match

Team Roster
Ľuboš Bartečko
Pavol Demitra
Michal Handzuš
Marián Hossa
Richard Kapuš
Richard Lintner
Ivan Majeský
Dušan Milo
Jaroslav Obšut
Žigmund Pálffy
Ján Pardavý
Rastislav Pavlikovský
Richard Pavlikovský
Róbert Petrovický
Pavol Rybár
Miroslav Šatan
Richard Šechný
Peter Smrek
Rastislav Staňa
Jozef Stümpel
Jaroslav Török
Ľubomír Višňovský

Luge

Men

(Men's) Doubles

Women

Nordic combined 

Men's sprint

Events:
 large hill ski jumping
 7.5 km cross-country skiing 

Men's individual

Events:
 normal hill ski jumping
 15 km cross-country skiing

Short track speed skating

Men

Snowboarding

Women's parallel giant slalom

References
Official Olympic Reports
 Olympic Winter Games 2002, full results by sports-reference.com

Nations at the 2002 Winter Olympics
2002
2002 in Slovak sport